Harold Arceneaux (born April 1, 1977) is an American professional basketball player who gained national attention during his collegiate career at Weber State University (1998–2000).  His nickname is "The Show". He played for the Lechugueros De Leon in Leon, Guanajuato, Mexico.

Early career
Born in New Orleans, Louisiana, Harold Arceneaux grew up in the B.W. Cooper housing development.  At 6-foot-6 and 215 pounds, he was an excellent athlete but struggled academically in high school.  Because he did not have suitable academic credentials to play basketball at a four-year university, he enrolled at the College of Eastern Utah, a junior college in Price, Utah.

As a freshman (1996–97), he led CEU to a 28–5 record and the Scenic West Conference regular-season championship. He averaged 17.3 points and 5.3 rebounds per game, shooting 57.3 percent on field goals and 40.9 percent on three-pointers.

Arceneaux transferred to Midland Junior College (in Midland, Texas) for the 1997–98 season.  He averaged 17.6 points and 6.0 rebounds per game, leading his team to a 26–4 record. He shot a phenomenal 64.3 percent on field goals. For his efforts, he earned NJCAA Second Team All-American honors. He was named Player of the Year in Region Five and in the Western Junior College Athletic Conference.

NCAA Division I career
Having completed two years of junior college basketball, Arceneaux transferred to Weber State (in Ogden, Utah) to play for Guy Beach (an assistant coach at Weber State who had been the head coach for Arceneaux at CEU).  As a junior (1998–99), Arceneaux teamed with Eddie Gill to lead the Wildcats to one of the most successful seasons in school history. With Arceneaux leading the way, Weber State won the Big Sky Conference championship and earned an invitation to the NCAA Tournament.

The Wildcats faced perennial powerhouse North Carolina in the first round of the tournament. North Carolina was making its 25th consecutive appearance in the NCAA Tournament and had won every first-round game since 1980.  The Wildcats were heavy underdogs against the Tar Heels, but Arceneaux and his teammates were not intimidated.

Weber State controlled the game, leading for most of the second half. North Carolina had no answer for Arceneaux, who scored from everywhere on the floor and finished with 36 points (20 in the second half). Weber State led by 10 points with 3:59 left in the game, but North Carolina fought back to make it close. Arceneaux made a pair of free throws with 13.3 seconds left, then he intercepted a North Carolina pass as time expired to preserve a 76–74 victory for the Wildcats. Weber State's win over mighty UNC remains one of the biggest upsets in NCAA Tournament history, and Arceneaux's spectacular performance made him a national star. To this day he can be found living rent free in the minds of UNC fans.

Weber State faced Florida in the second round. Again playing as underdogs, the Wildcats gave the Gators all they could handle. Once again, Arceneaux carried the team. He scored 32 points, but he did struggle somewhat in the second half. Weber State played well enough to send the game into overtime at 68–68, but Florida pulled away and won in OT, 82–74. The loss ended Weber State's tournament run, but it was enough to secure national respect for the little-known school.

Arceneaux finished the season with a school record of 713 points.  He averaged 22.3 points, 6.0 rebounds, and 1.7 steals per game, and was named Big Sky Conference Player of the Year.  He set a school record by scoring 30 points or more in six games during the season, including a 39-point performance against Eastern Washington. He also set an unofficial school record with 49 dunks during the season.

With the national spotlight shining on him, Arceneaux considered skipping his senior season at Weber State in pursuit of a career in the NBA. Arceneaux initially declared himself eligible for the draft, but he ultimately decided to return to Weber State for one more season.  His decision was criticized by many NBA scouts.

With a new head coach and several new players, Weber State struggled during Arceneaux's senior year (1999–2000). The Wildcats finished with a respectable 18–10 record but did not return to the NCAA Tournament.  In the first eight games of the season, Arceneaux averaged just 14 points per contest as opponents' defenses concentrated on him.  As the season went on, he adjusted his playing style, and his statistics soared.  He scored 27.0 points per game in conference play;, finished with a season average of 23.0 points per game (good for fifth in the nation), and added 7.4 rebounds per game.  He finished his collegiate career in spectacular fashion, averaging 39.5 points and 14.5 rebounds in the last two games of his career (against Montana State and Eastern Washington).

Professional career
Despite his success at Weber State, Arceneaux was not drafted by an NBA team, and played for various organizations home and abroad since leaving college, including professional teams in Argentina, Australia, France, Portugal, the Philippines, Venezuela and Mexico.

He played in the 2000 Rocky Mountain Revue with the Utah Jazz, but did not receive a contract offer from the team. After that, he had short stints with the Richmond Rhythm of the IBL and the Columbus Riverdragons of the NBDL.  He returned to the United States for the 2004–05 season, signing with the Utah Snowbears of the American Basketball Association.    Arceneaux scored 42 points in Utah's 130–115 playoff victory over the Long Beach Jam, which ultimately proved to be the franchise's final game.  He was named to the USBasket.com All-ABA team that season.

Arceneaux went back to Venezuela to play for Marinos de Anzoategui.  He averaged 15.5 points per game and shot 60.0 percent from the floor, leading his team to the 2005 Venezuelan LBP regular season championship and playoff championship.  He was also named MVP of the league All-Star Game.  He also played for the Marinos for part of 2006.

He returned to Utah for the 2006–07 season as a member of the Utah Eagles of the Continental Basketball Association.  Arceneaux averaged 19.8 points per game, but the Eagles struggled to a 6–18 record before the franchise ceased operations.

As of September 2009, Arceneaux was with Lechugueros de León in Mexico.
In November 2010, he was transferred to the team Club Atlético Quilmes (Mar del Plata)

Personal life and ventures outside of basketball
Arceneaux is Vice President of From The Ground Up Records, whose artists include Mullage (Trick'n), Mr. Magic and The Boyz Next Door featuring Jamie Ray.

References

1977 births
Living people
ABA All-Star Game players
American expatriate basketball people in Australia
American expatriate basketball people in France
American expatriate basketball people in Mexico
American expatriate basketball people in the Philippines
American expatriate basketball people in Portugal
American expatriate basketball people in Venezuela
American men's basketball players
Basketball players from New Orleans
Columbus Riverdragons players
Lechugueros de León players
Magnolia Hotshots players
Midland Chaps basketball players
Philippine Basketball Association imports
Shooting guards
Small forwards
Utah State Eastern Golden Eagles men's basketball players
Weber State Wildcats men's basketball players